American Terrorist: Timothy McVeigh & The Oklahoma City Bombing (2001) is a book by Buffalo, New York journalists Lou Michel and Dan Herbeck that chronicles the life of Timothy McVeigh from his childhood in Pendleton, New York, to his military experiences in the Persian Gulf War, to his preparations for and carrying out of the Oklahoma City bombing, to his trial and death row experience. One of the appendices lists all 168 people killed in the blast, along with brief biographical information. (There were plans to include a chapter about his execution in the softcover edition.) It is the only biography authorized by McVeigh himself, and was based on 75 hours of interviews that the authors had with McVeigh. McVeigh was said to be pleased overall with the book, but disappointed with the way he was portrayed and the explanation of his motive. Coauthor Michel said he viewed McVeigh as a "human being with a limited range of feelings in the areas of empathy and sympathy and with an oversized sense of rage and resentment."

According to Salon, McVeigh is portrayed in the book as an extremist:

On April 19, 2010, a two-hour special, the "McVeigh Tapes", narrated by Rachel Maddow, was aired by MSNBC which was based on 45 hours of the interviews that Michel conducted with McVeigh while he was in prison. The program was criticized as providing a forum for McVeigh to air his viewpoints, and as blunting the effect of McVeigh's cold statements with flashy, computer generated images.

See also
Terry Nichols

References

External links
 Resource materials for the writing of the book are housed at St. Bonaventure University

2001 non-fiction books
American biographies
Works about the Oklahoma City bombing
Non-fiction books about people convicted on terrorism charges